Rhythm Rocker may refer to:

Rick Rillera and the Rhythm Rockers, featuring Richard Berry 
Crazy Cavan and the Rhythm Rockers, Welsh band
The Rhythm Rockers, Robert Valdez, Gil Roman and David Perper
Kawasaki Rhythm Rocker, a synthesizer